Hugh Cholmondeley, 2nd Baron Delamere (3 October 1811 – 1 August 1887), styled The Honourable from 1821 until 1855, was a British peer and politician.

Personal
Hugh Cholmondeley was the eldest son of Thomas Cholmondeley. His mother was Henrietta Elizabeth Williams-Wynn, daughter of Sir Watkin Williams-Wynn, 4th Baronet, and Charlotte Grenville, and a granddaughter of Prime Minister George Grenville. Lord Delamere was an indirect descendant of Sir Robert Walpole, the first Prime Minister of Great Britain.

In 1848, Cholmondeley married Lady Sarah Hay-Drummond, daughter of Thomas Hay-Drummond, 11th Earl of Kinnoull; and the couple were childless when she died in 1859.  He married again in 1860, this time to Augusta Emily Seymour, daughter of Sir George Hamilton Seymour. The children of that marriage were:
 Hugh Cholmondeley, 3rd Baron Delamere (28 April 1870 – 13 November 1931); married, firstly, Lady Florence Cole, daughter of Lowry Cole, 4th Earl of Enniskillen, and Charlotte Baird, in 1899; had issue. He married, secondly, in 1928, Gwladys Beckett, who later became the second female Mayor of Nairobi.
 Hon. Sybil Cholmondeley (29 December 1871 – 26 May 1911); married Algernon Edwyn Burnaby and had issue.

Lady Delamere died in 1911. She had survived her husband for 23 years.

Career
Cholmondeley was elected to Parliament for Denbighshire as a Tory in 1840, a seat he held until 1841, and then represented Montgomery from 1841 to 1847. In 1855, Cholmondeley was called to the House of Lords when he succeeded his father as second Baron Delamere.

Lands and estates
In this period, Baron Delamere and his family were inextricable from the history of Cheshire and married into the Hibbert Family of Birtles Hall, Cheshire who had made their fortune in Jamaica.  The family seat was at Vale Royal Abbey.

Baron Delamere died at age 75 in August 1887; and he was succeeded in the lands, estates and title by the son from his second marriage, Hugh Cholmondeley.

Notes

References
 Debrett, John, Charles Kidd, David Williamson. (1990).  Debrett's Peerage and Baronetage.  New York: Macmillan. 
 Holland, G.D et al. (1977).  Vale Royal Abbey and House. Winsford, Cheshire: Winsford Local History Society. 
 Hayden, Joseph. (1851).  The book of dignities: containing rolls of the official personages of the British Empire. London: Longmans, Brown, Green, and Longmans.

External links
 
 National Portrait Gallery, London:   NPG 5639 (pencil drawing), Hugh Cholmondeley, 2nd Baron Delamere by Frederick Sargent (c. 1860s-1870s).

Delamere, Hugh Cholmondeley, 1st Baron
Delamere, Hugh Cholmondeley, 1st Baron
Delamere, Hugh Cholmondeley, 1st Baron
Conservative Party (UK) MPs for Welsh constituencies
Delamere, Hugh Cholmondeley, 1st Baron
UK MPs 1837–1841
UK MPs 1841–1847
Delamere, B2
People educated at Eton College
Hugh
Hugh